Lastra a Signa is a comune (municipality) in the metropolitan city of Florence in the Italian region Tuscany, located about  west of Florence.

Main sights
Hospital of Sant'Antonio (1411)
"Brunelleschi" Walls, although the attribution to the Florentine architect is uncertain
San Martino a Gangalandi parish church and museum

Twin towns
Lastra a Signa is twinned with:

  Grosio, Italy, since 1989 
  Saint-Fons, France, since 1995
  Munster, Germany, since 2015

References

External links

 Official website

Cities and towns in Tuscany